Catananche is a genus of flowering plants in the family Asteraceae. It is native to dry meadows in the Mediterranean region.

They are cultivated for their cornflower-like blooms appearing in summer, in shades of blue, yellow and white.  They are suitable for a sunny border, and for dried flower arrangements.

 Species
 Catananche arenaria Coss. & Durieu - Libya, Tunisia, Algeria, Morocco, Western Sahara, Mauritania
 Catananche caerulea L. - Spain, Portugal, France, Italy, Libya, Tunisia, Algeria, Morocco
 Catananche caespitosa Desf. - Algeria, Morocco
 Catananche lutea L. - Spain, Portugal, France, Italy, Greece, Macedonia, Turkey, Cyprus, Syria, Lebanon, Palestine, Libya, Tunisia, Algeria, Morocco
 Catananche montana Coss. & Durieu - Algeria, Morocco

Phylogeny 
According to recent genetic analyses, the genus Catananche is related to the genera Hymenonema, Scolymus and Gundelia. This results in the following relationship tree.

References

 

Cichorieae
Asteraceae genera